Gerald H. N. Myrden (July 1, 1922 – April 4, 2016) was a businessperson and politician in Newfoundland. He represented St. Barbe South in the Newfoundland House of Assembly from 1966 to 1971. The son of Alexander and Lillian Myrden, he was born in North Sydney, Nova Scotia and was educated in Corner Brook. He was president of G.H. Myrden Ltd, Tayden Co. Ltd, West Coast Supply Store Ltd and Western Beverages Ltd. Myrden was elected to the Newfoundland assembly in 1966.

References 

1922 births
2016 deaths
Liberal Party of Newfoundland and Labrador MHAs
20th-century Canadian politicians
20th-century Canadian businesspeople
People from North Sydney, Nova Scotia